Jiten Lalwani  is an Indian film and television actor. He is best known for playing Kiran Virani on Kyunki Saas Bhi Kabhi Bahu Thi, Inder Kashyap in Sasural Genda Phool and Samarjeet in Naagin 3.

Early life
Lalwani was born in Kanpur, Uttar Pradesh.  He is married to Dipika Lalwani. His family consists of his wife and two children Palak Lalwani who is also an actor; and son Aditya Lalwani is studying. Jiten came to Mumbai in 1993 and the same year got a small part in a play directed by Makarand Deshpande called YATRI.

Career 
Jiten Lalwani made his television debut  with Raman Kumar's  TV series Labella's, which was telecast in 1994 in BI TV as Cafe-18 After that he has appeared in TV shows like "Vishnu Puran", Shatranj, Parampara, Hasratein, Kartavya and  Kyunki Saas Bhi Kabhi Bahu Thi in the year 2000.

Filmography

Television 

 1993 - Zamana Badal Gaya as Rahul
 1994 – Labella's
 1995 – Shatranj
 1995 - V3+
 1996 – Parampara as Karan Malhotra: Naresh Malhotra's illegitimate son.
 1996 – Tara
 1997 – Jeene Bhi Do yaro
 1997 – Hasratein as Satish Verma
 1998 – Bhanwar
 1998 – Raahat
 1998 - Jane bhi do Paro
 1999 – Main Dilli Hoon as Yuvraj Janmejaya
 1999 – Kartavya
 2000 – 2006 Kyunki Saas Bhi Kabhi Bahu Thii As Kiran Virani
 2000 – Rishton Ki Dori
 2000 – Rishtey
 2001 –  Vishnu Puran as Virochana
 2001 – Hum Saath Aath Hain
 2001 – Shagun
 2001 – Kasam
 2002 – Papa
 2003 – Kissey Apna Kahein As Daanish (Arshad's neighbor whom Noor falls for)
 2003 – Miilee
 2003 – 2009 Phir Bhi Dil Hai Hindustani as Jai
 2004 – Raat Hone Ko Hai Story # 25: Kathputli
 2004 – Ssshhhh...Koi Hai as Captain Kishan 
 2005 – Baa Bahoo Aur Baby as Malay Tijoriwala
 2006 – Risshton Ki Dor as Kunal Shah
 2006 – Resham Dankh
 2006 – Kituu Sabb Jaantii Hai
 2006 – Pyaar Ke Do Naam: Ek Raadha, Ek Shyaam
 2007 – Jersey No. 10
 2007 – Mann Main Hai Vishwas
 2008 – Kal Hamara Hai
 2008 – Lo Ho Gayi Pooja Iss Ghar Ki
 2008 - 2009  Shree as Anand Raghuvanshi
 2010  Mano Ya Na Mano as Arun (Episode 3)
 2010–2012 Sasural Genda Phool as Indrabhan Kashyap
 2011 – Parvarrish – Kuchh Khattee Kuchh Meethi
 2012 – Sajda
 2012 – Devon Ke Dev Mahadev as Indradev
 2013 –  Code Red
 2013 - The Adventures of Hatim as Bilmoosh
 2013 – Dil Dosti Dance as Rishi Shekhawat
 2014 – Laut Aao Trisha
 2015 – Diya Aur Baati Hum
 2016 –  Krishnadasi
 2016 –  Dil Deke Dekho Sheri Chopra (Preet's Father)
 2017– Pehredaar Piya Ki as Bhuvan Singh
 2017–2019 Yeh Un Dinon Ki Baat Hai as Sameer Maheshwari's Voiceover
 2017–2018 - Rishta Likhenge Hum Naya as Bhuvan Singh
 2018 Kasam Tere Pyaar Ki as Advocate Vikaas Sharma
 2018 Papa By Chance as Harman Batra
 2018 Vikram Betaal Ki Rahasya Gatha as Shani Dev
 2019  Naagin 3 as Samarjeet
 2019 Paramavatar Shri Krishna as Shani Dev
 2019-2020  Shubharambh as Gunwant Reshammiya
 2020 Kahat Hanuman Jai Shri Ram as  Kesari
 2021 Paapnashini Ganga as Maharaj Himavat
 2021 Ziddi Dil Maane Na as  Dr. Deepak Mahajan
 2021-2022 Sasural Genda Phool 2 as Indrabhan Kashyap
 2022 RadhaKrishn as Maharishi Bhrigu
 2022 Ghum Hai Kisikey Pyaar Meiin as Dr. Machindra Thorat
 2022 Shoorveer

Awards

References

External links 
 

1969 births
Indian male film actors
Indian male television actors
Living people
Male actors in Hindi cinema
Male actors from Uttar Pradesh
21st-century Indian male actors